The Datu Cabaylo-class multi-mission offshore vessel is a new class of fisheries patrol vessel being constructed for the Philippine Bureau of Fisheries and Aquatic Resources (BFAR) under the Department of Agriculture.

The ships are being constructed by Josefa Slipways Inc.'s shipyard in Sual, Pangasinan province in the Philippines, and is believed to be using a design provided by Australian ship designer Incat Crowther.

The ships are designed to patrol Philippine waters and exclusive economic zone to protect against illegal fishing, and protection of marine resources. The ships will also be assisting the Philippine Coast Guard (PCG) in maritime patrol, and maritime law enforcement within Philippine waters and exclusive economic zone, as the ships are jointly crewed by personnel from the BFAR and PCG.

Ships in class

References

Ship types